Adore Me is a direct-to-consumer women's intimate apparel brand based in New York City. The company was started by Morgan Hermand-Waiche in 2010 while he was an MBA student at Harvard Business School and is a Certified B Corporation.

History
Adore Me was founded by Morgan Hermand-Waiche. He got the idea of starting a lingerie company in 2010 during his second year at Harvard Business School's M.B.A program, when he couldn't find lingerie that was both high quality and affordable. Hermand-Waiche spent three years working at management consulting firm McKinsey & Company prior to Adore Me. where he met Romain Liot, who joined with him at Adore Me.  Gary Bravard joined early on as co-founder.

Initial investors in Adore Me include Hermand-Waiche's Harvard professors, and angel investors Fabrice Grinda and Jose Marin. The company officially launched its website in March 2012. In the same year, Adore Me raised $2.5 million in its second round of funding with investments from Redhills Ventures, Jaina Capital, Ventech Capital, and other US angel investors. Adore Me reportedly sold 100,000 items in their first year of business.

In July 2013, Adore Me raised $8.5 million from investors in a Series B round of funding. Investors included Upfront Ventures, Redhills Ventures, and Mousse Partners.

In 2014, Adore Me was listed as the second fastest-growing private retail company on the Inc. 5000 list based on their 2013 sales of $5.6 million. They went on to generate $16.2 million in sales in 2014.

In 2016, Adore Me was ranked #9 on Crain's list of New York's 50 Fastest-Growing Companies. Revenue for 2016 was $83.9 million.

In 2017, Adore Me was named one of the Internet Retailer Top 1000 companies from DigitalCommerce360 and was listed on the Inc. 5000 list for the third time in four years. As of 2017, Adore Me had 121 full-time employees.

In November 2022, it was announced Adore Me had been acquired by Victoria's Secret for $400 million USD.

Products and services
Initially, Adore Me products included lingerie, sleepwear, swimwear, and related apparel, including plus sizes. In October 2016, Adore Me launched an activewear collection, ranging in size from petite to plus. In April 2017, Adore Me announced that they had launched their largest swim collection to date, with 88 pieces for standard and plus sized women. Current head of design, Helen Mears, formerly worked as head designer of the Angels brand at Victoria's Secret.

The brand has been compared to Zara regarding pricing and its practice of fast-fashion production. Adore Me primarily sells its products online. Customers shop through personalized "showrooms" and can purchase products a-la-carte on a one time basis or as part of a monthly subscription, known as "VIP Membership."

In December 2017, Adore Me launched their Bijou Collection. This luxury designer collection used fabrics such as velvet, French lace as well as gold logo plates and piercings.

As of July 2021, Adore Me carried various product categories, including bras and panties, lingerie, sleepwear, gifts, activewear, corsets and bralettes.

The company uses a style quiz and associated algorithm to recommend products and sizes to customers.

Expansion into retail 
In April 2016, Adore Me opened their first retail store as a showroom at their New York City headquarters. In June 2016, Adore Me partnered with Nordstrom to begin selling products in Nordstrom stores and on the company's e-commerce site. As of October 2016, Adore Me also partnered with Lord and Taylor to begin selling products in the Manhattan flagship store and online.

Adore Me opened its first permanent brick and mortar retail store in June, 2018. The first store was located in Staten Island Mall, NY — developed in partnership with Brookfield.

The store also has "smart" fitting rooms: the Adore Me customer can place an item, embedded with a radio frequency identification tag, on the hook in her fitting room to activate the fitting-room display screen. It will indicate the item chosen in full detail — revealing a product image, as well as size run and colors available.

On Black Friday of 2018, at 6am ET, Adore Me opened its second retail store, located in Bridgewater Commons Mall, Bridgewater, NJ. The store is 3,600 square-foot in size — which is double the size of its first location which opened in June 2018 at Staten Island Mall, in the Staten Island borough of New York City. The larger store incorporates lounge areas to encourage involvement with the space. The two stores were designed by New York City-based Lawrence Group.

In 2018, it was reported that the company planned to open 300 stores during the upcoming five years. In April 2019, Adore Me opened its third retail location at Providence Place Mall in Providence, Rhode Island. In May 2019 a fourth location was opened in Willowbrook, New Jersey. Both of these locations are owned by Brookfield Properties.

The Adore Me Group brands 
2019 started a string of acquisitions and development of new brands.

In February 2019, Adore Me purchased maternity brand Belabumbum. Adore Me states that "the acquisition was part of Adore Me's strategy to boost further growth by broadening the product offering to serve new phases of a woman's life". Belabumbum offers intimate apparel, sleep, lounge, and activewear for expecting and new moms.

In June 2019, Adore Me launched its first satellite brand, called Walkpop. Walkpop is a legwear brand, offering legwear, leggings, tights, and socks in a range of sizes, styles, and skin tones.

In January 2020, Adore Me launched period panties brand, Joyja. The panties come in sizes XS-4X. With the tagline "The Happy Period Panties," Joyja wants to bring more joy to "that time of the month" with bright colors, quirky prints, easy usage, and a significantly lower environmental impact than plastic tampons and pads. The brand also wants to improve access of period products for menstruating people in the US living below the poverty line. They do this through affordable pricing and by product donations

Branding campaigns 
During International Women's Day and the month of March 2019, Adore Me partnered with non-profit organization Girls Inc., which offered support, mentoring and guidance for girls. Adore Me sold a collection of panties featuring female-empowering prints with 100% of proceeds donated to Girls Inc.

In 2018, Adore Me conducted an artistic portrait series together with New York-based photojournalist Aude Adrien, highlighting women working at Adore Me, and their stories of how they got to where they are now, what inspires them, and how they define empowerment.

TV show appearances 
Project Runway: All Stars: Adore Me was featured on the final season of Project Runway: All Stars. Adore Me's Head Designer Helen Mears introduced the challenge for the third episode. The challenge was to create an outfit that used innerwear as outerwear, specifically, a corset. Christina Exie won the challenge and had her winning corset sold on AdoreMe.com after the episode aired.

International expansion 
Until 2017, Adore Me primarily focused on the North American market, delivering its products to all states in the U.S., as well as Canada, Australia, and the UK.

In September 2018, Adore Me officially announced its expansion to start selling in China. The brand has begun launching its products using the interactive livestream platform and global shopping marketplace service, ShopShops.

Technology 
Adore Me was one of the first retailers to use Google's Angular technology, a JavaScript-based, open-source, front-end web application framework, for its mobile and desktop websites. — supported by Google

Adore Me exploits its data on customer preferences from its Style Quiz in order to create a "personalized shopping experience". In 2018, Adore Me won a Nexty award for 'Best Use of Data in Marketing'.

Adore Me is the founder of New York Hearts Tech (NYHT), a community for tech-focused startups located in NYC.

Adore Me utilizes Kubernetes in its proprietary software tools — the open-source system for automating deployment, scaling, and management of containerized applications. Adore Me is an early adopter of the system and hosts regular meetups in their European HQ for other practitioners, aiming to share knowledge about emerging technologies.

Models 
Adore Me has promoted "body positivity" and "inclusivity" within the brand. They have worked with models such as Iskra Lawrence, a spokesmodel for body positive campaigns;,, transgender influencer Rose Montoya, and Nina Agdal, a Sports Illustrated swimsuit model; In 2016 Adore Me worked with plus model Sophie Tweed-Simmons.

Adore Me Services (AMS) 
Adore Me owns and operates its own distribution center, called Adore Me Services (AMS),based in Secaucus, New Jersey. The brand opened the new distribution center in January 2019. According to Morgan Hermand-Waiche, Adore Me Founder & CEO, the new center will support the fulfillment of product to the stores. The opening of AMS was part of the company's second phase into expanding internationally. The solution combines a high-density robotic storage and order picking system with automated putwalls and conveyor belts.

Customer service 
Customer reviews are visible and available for each product on adoreme.com, assisting customers to see product fit, satisfaction and beyond.

Adore Me received Retail TouchPoints 'Customer Engagement Awards' in 2017 and 2018. The brand won the Excellence Awards as Best in 2018 Class Omnichannel Experience during Customer Contact Week.

In December 2017, the company implemented a hybrid-bot on its website. The hybrid-bot enables Adore Me customers to receive live support via several messaging platforms.

In the company's early days, many customers had complained about its use of the controversial practice of negative option billing. Adore Me offered the customers the choice of buying a product at full price or of buying the same product at a substantial discount by joining a membership club.  The club then billed customers a fixed amount each month unless the customer bought lingerie or opted out for the month.  While the membership may be cancelled, the customers have found it difficult to cancel. Following an investigation filed by the Federal Trade Commission about Adore Me's deceptive billing practices, the company agreed to refund up to $1.38 million to customers that had previously forfeited their store credits and to clearly disclose how much customers would pay on its monthly subscription plan.

In 2017, Adore Me announced the launch of its scholarship program, offering a $1,000 scholarship to support women pursuing a degree in business. The company began awarding female students who had either started their own business or were planning to do so in the future.

References

Lingerie brands
Lingerie retailers
American companies established in 2012
Clothing companies established in 2012
Clothing companies of the United States
Companies based in New York City
2012 establishments in New York City